Fainu'ulelei L. P. Falefatu Alailima-Utu is an American Samoan lawyer who has served as the Attorney General of American Samoa since 2021.

Early life and career
Alailima-Utu is the son of former American Samoa House Speaker Fainu'ulelei S. Utu. While attending law school at the University of California Los Angeles, Alailima-Utu participated in protests over a 1989 police brutality incident.

From 1990 to 2003, he worked in the Attorney General's office, as assistant attorney general. He was the legal counsel for the Development Bank of American Samoa from January 2003 to March 2014. After this period, he was the executive director of American Samoa Legal Aid (ASLA). Under his tenure, ASLA assisted victims of Cyclone Gita and received a grant to expand services to the Manuʻa Islands.

Attorney General
Alailima-Utu was nominated as Attorney General of American Samoa in January 2021, and approved by a unanimous vote by both the House of Representatives and Senate.

References

American Samoan Attorneys General
Living people
UCLA School of Law alumni
Year of birth missing (living people)